El Camino Real is the fifth studio album by Argentine band Todos Tus Muertos released in 1998. It is also Fidel Nadal's final full-length album with the band, preceding the announcement of the Todos Tus Muertos break-up in 2000. It was first TTM album distributed in Japan by Universal Music Group, and published by Polydor label.

Background 
It's considered the last chapter from Todos Tus Muertos first era. El Camino Real was recorded and produced at Panda Studios during largely 1997, by the band with Fernando Bocha Gutiérrez, the making of the album was an arduous process, largely because Fidel Nadal and Pablo Molina row began to convert to Rastafari during these sessions, and refused to perform punk rock music. Nadal was keenly aware of new styles and wanted to keep the current and experimental music like rap, hip hop, while Gamexane and Félix was seemingly more focused on the band's punk rock and reggae roots. As a result, there was friction, and the tension between the members would increase over the upcoming years.

Track listing

Personnel 
Todos Tus Muertos
Fidel Nadal - Lead vocals.
Pablo Molina - Vocals and Percussion.
Horacio "Gamexane" Villafañe - Lead Guitar and Backing vocals, Second vocals on "Politicos".
Félix Gutierrez - Bass guitar and Backing vocals.
Pablo Pontezoni - Drums.

Collaborators
Willy Calegari - Keyboards.
Sergio Rotman - Sax.
Fermin Muguruza - Vocals on "Dignidad" and "Te vamos a quemar".
Jason - Trumpet and Trombone on "Asesinos profesionales", "Besos de seda" and "Jah Lion".
Martín "La Mosca" Lorenzo - Percussion on "El camino real", "Te vamos a quemar" and "La casa rosa".
Sergio Arrastia - Percussion on "No te la vas a acabar".
Lickle Roxie - Vocals on "No te la vas a acabar".
Cristian Aldana - Guitar on "Políticos".

Additional credit 
Richard Trollo - Engineer.
Mario Altamirano - Engineer.
Fito Keller - Photography.
Fernando Bocha Gutiérrez - Executive Producer.
TTM - Design.

References

1998 albums
Todos Tus Muertos albums